Du Cane Court is an Art Deco apartment block on Balham High Road, Balham, south London. A distinctive local landmark, it was opened in 1937 and, with 677 apartments, is the largest privately owned block of flats under one roof in Europe.

It was a popular place to live for many music hall stars in the 1930s and 1940s and boasted a social club, on the top floor, before the area was converted into flats. Past residents have included the comedian Tommy Trinder. Currently comedian and writer Arthur Smith, the self-styled 'Bard of Balham', is a resident.

During the Second World War it was speculated that Du Cane Court had escaped bombing because it was planned for use by military officers in the event of a successful German invasion. This and related legends were explored by writer Steve Punt in a 2009 BBC Radio 4 programme called Punt PI.

Similar Art Deco residential buildings in London include Florin Court, Cholmeley Lodge and Hillfield Court

References

External links
 
 Vincent, Gregory A History Of Du Cane Court September 2011

Buildings and structures in the London Borough of Wandsworth
Apartment buildings in London
Art Deco architecture in London
Residential buildings completed in 1937
Balham